All Saints' Primary School may refer to:

Malaysia
All Saints' National Primary School, Taiping, Perak

Northern Ireland
All Saints' Primary School, Ballela, Ballela, County Down, Northern Ireland
All Saints' Primary School, Ballymena, Ballymena, County Antrim, Northern Ireland

South Australia
All Saints' Primary School, Seaford, Seaford, South Australia